Jørgen Hårek Kosmo (5 December 1947 – 24 July 2017) was a Norwegian politician. From 2005 to 2013 he was Auditor General of Norway, after representing the Labour Party in the Storting (parliament) for 20 years, of which the final 4 years were as President of the Storting.

Kosmo was Minister of Defence from 1993 to 1997 and Minister of Labour and Government Administration from 2000 to 2001. He was member of the legislature Storting from 1985 to 2005 and served as President of the Storting (speaker) from 2001 to 2005. Kosmo was in 2004 appointed County Governor of Telemark, but could not take over the position while he was member of parliament.

By profession Jørgen Kosmo was a construction worker. He held positions of trust in the Norwegian Confederation of Trade Unions (1974–75) and the Norwegian Union of Building Workers (1979–83). From 1979 to 1985 he was member of the municipal council of Horten, the last 2 years as mayor.

References

External links 
 Biography at the Norwegian parliament

Government ministers of Norway
Auditors general of Norway
1947 births
2017 deaths
Presidents of the Storting
Members of the Storting
Labour Party (Norway) politicians
People from Fauske
21st-century Norwegian politicians
20th-century Norwegian politicians
Defence ministers of Norway